Lukáš Vařecha (born March 1, 1990) is a Czech professional ice hockey player. He played with HC Bílí Tygři Liberec in the Czech Extraliga during the 2009–10 Czech Extraliga season.

References

External links

1990 births
Czech ice hockey forwards
HC Bílí Tygři Liberec players
Living people
HC Vlci Jablonec nad Nisou players
HC Benátky nad Jizerou players
Czech expatriate ice hockey players in Germany